The military forces of Armenia and Azerbaijan have been engaged in a border conflict since 12 May 2021, when Azerbaijani soldiers crossed several kilometers into Armenia in the provinces of Syunik and Gegharkunik, occupying about  of Armenian territory. Azerbaijan has not withdrawn its troops from internationally recognised Armenian territory despite calls to do so by the European Parliament, United States and France – two of three co-chairs of the OSCE Minsk Group.

The crisis further escalated in July 2021, with clashes taking place on the Armenia–Nakhchivan border. More clashes have taken place since then, including in the Gegharkunik–Kalbajar area in November 2021, as well as a brief, but substantial, escalation of fighting in September 2022, with casualties being reported from both sides.

In a joint statement on 17 November 2021, Marina Kaljurand (the European Union's chair of the delegation for relations with the South Caucasus), Andrey Kovatchev (the European Parliament's standing rapporteur on Armenia), and Željana Zovko (the European Parliament's standing rapporteur on Azerbaijan) called the military operation launched by Azerbaijan on 16 November 2021 the worst violation to date of the 2020 Nagorno-Karabakh ceasefire agreement.

Background

Prior to 2020, 4 districts of Azerbaijan on the Armenia–Azerbaijan border were occupied by Artsakh ethnic forces. The issue of demarcation of the border between Armenia and Azerbaijan arose immediately after the defeat of Armenia in the Second Nagorno-Karabakh War, and Azerbaijan regaining control over its occupied territories. Before the war, there was no physical border between Armenia and the Armenian occupied districts of Azerbaijan, and some Armenian villages were expanding into Azerbaijan's territory, while some water sources and pastures were on Azerbaijani soil.

In addition, there are other border related issues, as Armenia controls since 1990s several villages of Qazakh District of Azerbaijan, including three Azerbaijani exclaves, and also an exclave village of Karki in Nakhchivan Autonomous Republic, while Azerbaijan controls an Armenian exclave village of Artsvashen.

On 13 April 2021, Azerbaijan's president Ilham Aliyev made irredentist claims over Armenia's capital Yerevan, Zangezur (Syunik), and Sevan (Gegharkunik), declaring that they are "historical lands" of Azerbaijan. In a statement in April 2021, he said that if Armenia would not agree to provide a corridor from Nakhchivan to western Azerbaijan through Armenia's Syunik Province, then Azerbaijan would establish it through the use of force, claiming that Azerbaijani people would return to what he described as "West Zangazur".

A joint statement by the European Parliament Chair of the Delegation for relations with the South Caucasus, Marina Kaljurand, and Standing Rapporteurs on Armenia, Andrey Kovatchev, and Azerbaijan, Željana Zovko, among other things, condemned the statements made by the Azerbaijani side: "To de-escalate the situation, it is of utmost importance that inflammatory rhetoric ceases immediately. In this context, we condemn in particular recent statements by Azerbaijani representatives regarding so-called ‘West Zangezur’ and referring to the territory of the Republic of Armenia as Azerbaijani ‘ancestral land’. Such statements are highly irresponsible and threaten to undermine regional security further."

Timeline

May 2021
Reports emerged regarding the crossing of Azerbaijani soldiers into Armenian territory on 12 May, in two areas along the Armenia–Azerbaijan border; the area around Lake Sev, located to the east of the village of Ishkhanasar and mountain Mets Ishkhanasar, and to the north of the town of Goris and the villages of Verishen and Akner in the Syunik Province, as well near the villages of Verin Shorzha and Kut in the Gegharkunik Province. Prime Minister of Armenia Nikol Pashinyan said that the reports regarding the Azerbaijani advance on Lake Sev were correct, negotiations were ongoing for an Azerbaijani withdrawal, and that Armenian forces had stopped the advance without any skirmishes having taken place.

The Armenian side said that according to the Soviet maps, the larger part of the lake is within Armenia, and the smaller part is within Azerbaijan. The Armenpress news agency published the map of the General Staff of the USSR Armed Forces numbered J-38-21, with a scale of 1:100,000 showing Lake Sev with its eastern, western and southern shores located in the territory of the Armenian SSR and only a section of the northern shore of the lake covering nearly 10% of the lake located in the Azerbaijani SSR, and the smaller lake located east from Sev Lake entirely in the Armenian territory. The Azerbaijani side, showed a map with the entire Sev lake belonging to Azerbaijan, and refused to leave the territory.

On 14 May, the Prime Minister of Armenia, Nikol Pashinyan, formally appealed to the Russian-led Collective Security Treaty Organization (CSTO) to hold consultations regarding the Azerbaijani incursion into Armenia. On the same day, Pashinyan asked Russian President Vladimir Putin for military support. Armenian and Azerbaijani military officials convened at the border together with representatives of the Russian military deployed in the Syunik Province for several hours of negotiations, without any immediate resulting agreement being announced afterwards.

On 15 May, Armenia's Defense Ministry stated that the situation regarding the Azerbaijani incursion on 12–13 May remained unresolved, while the Azerbaijani military had retreated from some positions due to Armenian troop movements, and that negotiations in order to bring about a peaceful settlement to the crisis were expected to continue during the day.

On 15 May, the press service of the Ministry of Foreign Affairs of Azerbaijan dismissed the reports of an Azerbaijani incursion into Armenia, stating that it was enforcing the borders of Azerbaijan on the basis of maps defining the border between Armenia and Azerbaijan, criticizing the Armenian statements as "provocative" and "inadequate", that the Armenian authorities were using the situation for pre-election domestic political purposes, and that Azerbaijan was negotiating with Armenia regarding the normalization of the Armenia–Azerbaijan border.

During a call with Kazakh President Kassym-Jomart Tokayev, Azerbaijani President Aliyev described Armenia's decision to appeal to the CSTO as an attempt to "internationalize the issue".

On 19 May 2021, Russian Foreign Minister Sergey Lavrov said that Russia came up with an initiative to create a joint Armenia-Azerbaijan commission on demarcation and delimitation of the borders, in which Russia could play the role of a consultant or mediator. On 20 May 2021, acting prime minister Nikol Pashinyan confirmed that Armenia and Azerbaijan were close to an agreement on the creation of a joint commission to demarcate the border between the two countries, with Russia acting as a mediator, and each country appointing delegates to the commission by 31 May.

In the morning of 20 May 2021, a group of Azerbaijani servicemen crossed the border near the village of Khoznavar in the Goris region, walking 1.5 km into Armenian territory. They were forced back to their original positions by Armenian forces, but they then made a second attempt to cross the border in the evening, resulting in a fight between Armenian and Azerbaijani servicemen. The General Prosecutor's Office of Armenia reported that eleven Armenian soldiers were injured and hospitalized, and that there were injuries from the Azerbaijani side, too. The videos of the incident were leaked on social media, initially a video of Azerbaijani military men attacking and beating Armenian soldiers, and, on the next day, another video showing the Armenian Armed Forces expelling Azerbaijani servicemen from their territory appeared. 
 
On 27 May 2021, after the tensions rose further after the capture of six Armenian soldiers by Azerbaijani forces early in the morning, Armenian Prime Minister Nikol Pashinyan called for the deployment of international observers along portions of Armenia's border with Azerbaijan. “If the situation is not resolved this provocation could inevitably lead to a large-scale clash,” Pashinyan said at an emergency meeting of Armenia's Security Council held in the evening, suggesting Armenia and Azerbaijan to pull back their troops from the border areas and let Russia and/or the United States and France, the two other co-chairs of the OSCE Minsk Group, deploy their observers there. The disengagement of troops and the launch of the monitoring mission, should be followed by a process of “ascertaining border points” supervised by the international community, the Prime Minister said.

On 28 May 2021, the EU spokesperson Peter Stano called for immediate de-escalation and urged both sides to pull back their forces to positions held before 12 May and engage in negotiations on border delimitation and demarcation, welcoming proposals for a possible international observation mission and expressing readiness to provide expertise and help on border delimitation and demarcation. The EU continues to call on Azerbaijan to release all prisoners of war and detainees without delay and welcomes all efforts aimed at decreasing tensions.

July 2021

After an incident on 6 July in the Agdam District, Armenian and Azerbaijani forces clashed again in the directions of Azerbaijan's Tovuz, Gadabay, Nakhchivan and Shusha districts from 7 to 15 July. On 14 July, the Armenian defence ministry stated that the Azerbaijani engineers tried to advance their military positions near Yeraskh in the Nakhchivan section of the Armenia–Azerbaijan border, and clashes erupted. The ministry added that the Azerbaijani side had started shelling Yeraskh, using mortars and grenade launchers, with an Armenian soldier getting killed and the community leader of Yeraskh getting wounded. The Azerbaijani Defense Ministry stated that an Azerbaijani soldier stationed near Heydarabad was wounded during the clashes, and added that the "responsibility for the creation of tension along the state border of the two countries lies entirely with Armenia." The Azerbaijani Defense Ministry later on the same day stated that the Armenian forces had fired at the Azerbaijani positions near Istisu in Kalbajar and Aghdam in Tovuz. On 19 July, the Armenian side reported that further clashes had erupted near Yeraskh.

On 22 July 2021, President of Azerbaijan Ilham Aliyev made another irredentist claim over Armenia's province of Syunik (also known as Zangezur), saying that it's "our own territory":

On 23 July 2021, the Azerbaijani Ministry of Defence stated that one of its soldiers was killed by Armenian sniper fire in Kalbajar District near the Armenia–Azerbaijan border. Meanwhile, the Armenian MoD stated that three Armenian servicemen were wounded as Azerbaijani forces opened fire on Armenian positions located in the Gegharkunik section.

On 28 July 2021, the Human Rights Defender of Armenia reported about intensive firing from the Azerbaijani side between 03:30 and 03:40 targeting civilian buildings in the villages of Verin Shorzha and Saradeghy in the Gegharkunik Province. On the same day, three Armenian soldiers were killed in renewed clashes with Azerbaijani forces in the Kalbajar District and Gegharkunik Province, with four others wounded. Armenia accused Azerbaijan of "occupying Armenia's sovereign territory" as the Azerbaijani side blamed the incident on Armenian forces, stating that they opened fire first. Azerbaijan also reported 2 soldiers wounded during the skirmish.

On 29 July, the Azerbaijani Ministry of Defence stated that Armenian forces broke the ceasefire in the morning, using automatic rifles and grenade launchers. Armenian authorities then stated that the Azerbaijani side had violated the ceasefire, but Azerbaijan denied that it broke the ceasefire. An Armenian soldier was wounded in the shootout.

On 31 July, Armenian authorities stated that Azerbaijani forces fired upon a logistic support vehicle delivering food to Armenian military positions in Yeraskh. As a result, the vehicle was "seriously damaged".

August 2021
On 13 August 2021, Armenia and Azerbaijan reported about shelling on the border. The Armenian MoD stated that the Azerbaijani units opened fire from various calibre firearms at the Armenian positions in the Gegarkunik section, meanwhile Azerbaijan said that the Armenian forces had opened fire in the direction of the Kalbajar and Gadabay Districts.

On 16 August 2021, two further Armenian soldiers were killed by Azerbaijani forces. Vahan Tatosyan died from sniper fire at 09:50hrs in Yeraskh, while Arman Hakobyan was killed in Gegharkunik at 18:10hrs.

On 17 August 2021, Armenian Ministry of Defence reported that another  Armenian soldier was wounded as a result of a shelling attack from Azerbaijan.

On 27 August 2021,  the Armenian Human Rights Defender reported that Azerbaijani troops had targeted Kut village: "Elderly people and children were in the yard at the time of the shooting. There were also children in the house at that time. On August 27, at around 10 pm, Azerbaijani armed forces fired intensively at civilian houses in the village of Kut, Gegharkunik region, directly targeting the civilian population,” reported Arman Tatoyan.

September 2021
On 1 September 2021, another Armenian soldier was killed by Azerbaijani forces. Gegham Sahakyan died from sniper fire at 11:10 am in Yeraskh.

October 2021
On 9 October 2021, the Armenian MoD reported that an Armenian serviceman, Misak Khachatryan, was injured by a shot from border with Azerbaijan in Ararat Province.

On 11 October 2021, an Armenian civilian named Aram Tepnants was shot dead by Azerbaijani snipers in the town of Martakert. Russia's Ministry of Defense confirmed the incident and stated that Russian peacekeepers launched an investigation involving both sides.

On 15 October 2021, Azerbaijani MoD reported that an Azerbaijani soldier was killed by Armenian sniper fire.

On 15 and 16 October 2021, Armenian media reported that Azerbaijani forces shelled the village of Yeraskh, causing fires which damaged crops.

November 2021
On 8 November 2021, one Armenian civilian was killed and three wounded as Azerbaijani troops opened fire at Armenians repairing a water supply pipe near Shushi. Russia's Ministry of Defense confirmed the incident and stated that Russian peacekeepers launched an investigation involving both sides. The U.S. Department of State Bureau of European and Eurasian Affairs condemned the killing of Armenian civilian in its Twitter page.

On 16 November 2021, clashes between Azerbaijan and Armenia took place at the Syunik–Gegharkunik/Kalbajar–Lachin regions. Seven Azerbaijani and six Armenian soldiers were killed, while 32 Armenian soldiers were captured. According to Armenian military commander and politician Samvel Babayan, Azerbaijan was trying to meet two objectives — to establish a corridor to Nakhchivan and to impose a peace treaty through recognition of territorial integrity. The clashes ended at 18:30 local time after a Russian-mediated ceasefire. The figure of 41 square kilometers has been used since May, which would suggest that no new land was occupied in this newest round of fighting, but this contradicted with the Armenian MOD report, according to which Armenia has lost two military positions on 16 November.

On 22 November 2021, an Armenian soldier was killed by Azerbaijani forces near the village of Norabak in Gegharkunik province.

December 2021
On December 3, a 65-year-old civilian, Seyran Sargsyan, from the Chartar village of Martuni district was captured and killed by the Azerbaijani military. The Russian peacekeepers have started and investigation on the case involving both sides.

On 4 December, Azerbaijan freed 10 captured Armenian soldiers captured from the 16 November clashes in exchange of maps detailing the location of landmines in Nagorno Karabakh, the agreement was achieved with Russian mediation.

On 9 December, the Azerbaijani Ministry of Defence announced that an Azerbaijani soldier was killed in a skirmish with Armenian forces on the Azeri-Armenian border.

On 10 December, the Armenian Ministry of Defence announced that an Armenian soldier was killed after clashes with Azerbaijani forces on the Gegharkunik area of the Armenian-Azerbijani border.

On 18 December, two Azerbaijani servicemen were captured by Armenian forces near Lachin, the soldiers were later released.

January 2022
On 11 January, one Azerbaijani soldier and three Armenian soldiers were killed in a shootout in the Verin Shorzha area of Armenia's Gegharkunik province.

March 2022 
On 8 March, it was reported that the only gas pipeline leading from Armenia to the Armenian-inhabited enclave of Artsakh was damaged, as tension spiked in the region following the launch of Russia's invasion of Ukraine. The energy supply was reportedly disrupted again on the evening of March 21. Armenian Prime Minister Nikol Pashinian and Artsakh authorities have accused the Azerbaijan government of deliberately creating additional humanitarian problems for the population of Artsakh.

On 24 March, according to the government of Artsakh, Azerbaijani soldiers crossed the Line of Contact and took control of the village of Farukh, with women and children being evacuated from the nearby village of Khramort. Russian peacekeepers were reported to be negotiating with Azerbaijan. On 27 March 2022, the Russian Defense Ministry reported that Azerbaijani forces had withdrawn from the village. This statement was refuted by the Azerbaijani Ministry of Defense. On 30 March 2022, Artsakh authorities stated that Azerbaijani forces were still occupying the strategically important Karaglukh heights.

April 2022 
On 6 April, Prime Minister Nikol Pashinyan and President İlham Aliyev met in Brussels for peace talks mediated by the European Council President Charles Michel.

On 6 April, the government of Azerbaijan said that Armenian forces shelled Azerbaijani military positions deployed in the Republic of Armenia's north-eastern borderline. However, Armenia's Defense Ministry refuted this.

On 15 April, Azerbaijani forces crossed the Line of Contact near the village of Seysulan. Later that day, they reportedly agreed to pull back.

August 2022
Clashes broke out again in late July and early August 2022. On August 1, the Artsakh Defence Army reported that Azerbaijan attempted to breach the line of contact in northern Nagorno-Karabakh, wounding one soldier. Azerbaijan Defence Ministry denied these claims, and the Russian Defence Ministry reported no ceasefire violations that day.

Over the next two days, clashes erupted again, killing one Azerbaijani soldier, two Artsakh Defence Army soldiers, and wounding 14 others. The international community reacted quickly, with Russia accusing Azerbaijan of breaking the fragile ceasefire and the European Union urging an immediate cessation of hostilities.

According to the Azerbaijani Defence Ministry, Artsakhi soldiers had attacked Azerbaijan army posts in the area of Lachin, killing a conscript. In response, the Azerbaijani army stated it conducted an operation called "Revenge" and took control of several strategic heights in Karabakh. The Artsakh Defence Army accused Azerbaijan of violating the ceasefire and declared a partial mobilization. Following the flare-up, Armenia urged the international community to assist in putting an end to Azerbaijan's "aggressive actions".

On 26 August, the Azerbaijani armed forces took full control of the Lachin Corridor area including Lachin and the villages of Zabukh and Sus as part of the 2020 cease-fire agreement,

September 2022

On the morning of 13 September 2022, large-scale clashes erupted on Armenia-Azerbaijan border. The Defence Ministry of Azerbaijan stated that Armenian forces had staged "large-scale subversive acts" and fired upon Azerbaijani positions near the border districts of Dashkasan, Kalbajar and Lachin. The Defence Ministry of Armenia stated that Azerbaijani forces had attacked Armenian positions near the cities of Vardenis, Goris, Sotk and Jermuk with artillery and heavy weapons.  At least 105 Armenian soldiers and 71 Azerbaijani military personnel were killed.

On 14 September 2022, the Armenian Ministry of Defence stated that Azerbaijan used artillery, mortar, attack drones and small arms in attacks along the Armenia-Azerbaijan border. The same day, the Azerbaijani Ministry of Defence reported that units of the Azerbaijani Army had come under Armenian fire in Kalbajar and Lachin districts. On 15 September 2022 at 12:20 a.m., Secretary of the Security Council of Armenia Armen Grigoryan announced that a ceasefire agreement had been reached between Armenia and Azerbaijan. The Azerbaijani side made no statement about a ceasefire.

October 2022

On 6 October 2022, Prime Minister of Armenia Nikol Pashinyan and President of Azerbaijan Ilham Aliyev met at the European Political Community summit in Prague in an attempt to resolve the long running Nagorno-Karabakh conflict and the recent Armenia–Azerbaijan border crisis. Following the meeting, it was stated that the two parties agreed to the deployment of a European Union led mission, which would be deployed on the Armenian side of their shared border for a period of two months, starting in October 2022. The stated aim of the mission is to "build confidence and, through its reports, to contribute to the border commissions" work towards delimitation of the border between the two parties.

Reactions

Supranational organisations
  European Parliament declared that the temporary entry of troops from Azerbaijan into the territory of Armenia amount to a violation of the territorial integrity of Armenia and of international law; whereas this violation of Armenian sovereign territory follows worrying statements by Azerbaijani representatives, including the president, which appeared to raise territorial claims and threaten the use of force and thereby undermine the efforts towards security and stability in the region. The European Parliament also issued a report in March 2023, condemning Azerbaijan's attack of Armenia in 2022 and -- considering CSTO's inaction during the invasion -- encouraged Armenia to seek alternative security alliances.
  The Co-Chairs of the OSCE Minsk Group took note of the reported detention of six Armenian soldiers on 27 May and called for the release of all prisoners of war and other detainees on an all for all basis.
 Collective Security Treaty Organization, a military alliance in Eurasia consisting of several post-Soviet states, declared that it is closely monitoring the situation evolving in Syunik and if necessary, measures will be taken according to CSTO policy.
Following the 16 November 2021 escalation, the EU Delegation for relations with the South Caucasus released a statement expressing serious concern over “heavy fighting” and the “military operation launched by Azerbaijan in response to alleged provocations” and condemned “any attempts at “borderisation”, as observed since the incursion of Azerbaijani troops into Armenian territory on 12 May”.

Other countries

  The U.S. State Department initially voiced concerns regarding "increased tensions along a non-demarcated portion of the Armenia-Azerbaijan border", urging "restraint in de-escalating the situation peacefully". Later on, U.S. State Department spokeswoman Jalina Porter stated that the United States were monitoring the situation closely, and that it expected Azerbaijan to "immediately pull back its forces":

In his 27 May 2021 press statement, U.S. State Department spokesperson Ned Price stated that the U.S. considers any movements along the non-demarcated areas of the international border between Armenia and Azerbaijan to be provocative and unnecessary and rejects the use of force to demarcate the border, calling on both sides to return to their previous positions and to cease military fortification of the non-demarcated border and the emplacement of landmines. Specifically, the U.S. called on Azerbaijan and Armenia to relocate their forces to the positions they held on 11 May, to de-escalate tensions, and create space for a peaceful negotiation process to demarcate the border on an urgent basis. During his visit to Foreign Ministry of Armenia on 10 June 2021, the Acting U.S. Assistant Secretary for European and Eurasian Affairs Philip Reeker reaffirmed the U.S. position on the necessity to withdraw Azerbaijani forces from Armenian border.
  Mojtaba Zolnouri, the head of the Iran's Islamic Consultative Assembly’s National Security and Foreign Policy Committee, declared that Tehran will categorically not accept any change in international borders in the region and that the territorial integrity of the countries in the region must be preserved. “Therefore, if part of the territory of Armenia is to be taken and our border conditions change, that is, to have a new neighbor, it is not acceptable for us" Zolnouri said. Later, in a meeting with the acting Armenian Foreign Minister, the Iranian Foreign Minister Mohammad Javad Zarif confirmed that any redrawing of the borders is a red line for Iran.
  Russian President Vladimir Putin urged both countries to respect the ceasefire agreement, and that Russia will continue mediating efforts. Putin's spokesman Dmitry Peskov stated that "The Armenian side expressed extreme concern over the situation at the border", and that "President Putin shared this concern". Russian Foreign Minister Sergey Lavrov stated that Russia sees no reason to escalate emotions with regard to the situation at the border: “Not a single shot was fired, no skirmishes took place there. They sat down, calmly began to discuss how to defuse this situation, and asked us for assistance. Our military provided such assistance, an agreement was reached. I do not see any reason to escalate emotions in connection with this quite non-routine, but in any case calmly settled issue."
 The AKP's spokesperson,  Ömer Çelik, condemned Armenia's "aggressive policies"; and also said, "We condemn this attack in the strongest manner." Çelik added that Turkey would oppose Armenian efforts to "endanger" the region. He also criticized France's pro-Armenia response; urging other countries to condemn "Armenian attacks". Celik clarified that "Turkey will support Azerbaijan in whatever they want" and accused Armenia of violating Azerbaijan's territorial integrity.
 The Ministry of Foreign Affairs of Pakistan reaffirmed the support from people and government of Pakistan for Azerbaijan on Nagorno Karabakh conflict. Pakistan is the only country in the world that does not recognize Armenia as a country since the creation of new states of Azerbaijan and Armenia after collapse of Soviet union to show a solidarity and support with Azerbaijani people on Nagorno Karabkh conflict.

Other organizations
 On 23 June 2021, the Reporters Without Borders organization reported that a group of Spanish journalists have been threatened with death by Azerbaijani forces while reporting on their position in the Gegharkunik province. RWB condemned "this unacceptable act toward journalists".

Analysis

Maps
Caucasian Knot interviewed three Russian experts who agreed that defining the border between Armenia and Azerbaijan on the basis of Soviet-era maps is a challenge. Geography professor Alexey Gunya stated that the 80% of Lake Sev is on the Armenian territory based on larger 1:100,000 scale topographic maps which should be preferred over smaller 1:1,000,000 scale maps showing the lake within Azerbaijani territory that the Azerbaijani side relies on. Specialist in Caucasian studies Alexander Skakov said that there are many different maps, the details on them are contradictory and each side uses the map that is more advantageous for them.

"Borderization" of Armenia
Laurence Broers, South Caucasus programme director at London-based peacebuilding organization Conciliation Resources, tweeted that Azerbaijan keeps maintaining maximum pressure on Armenia to extract concessions on other issues, such as minefield maps, the Syunik corridor, and that never-demarcated borders allow conversion of dated or ambiguous cartographies into better positions. This "borderization", according to Broers, also pressures Russia by showing that Russian security guarantees to Armenia are tractable relative to other issues; testing CSTO collective security guarantees and testing Russia's capacity to broker. Broers further expanded on the theme of "borderization" of Armenia by Azerbaijan in his review published by Chatham House. The tactics applied by Azerbaijan towards Armenia after the 2020 war were described as “borderization” tactics in an article published in the Georgetown Journal of International Affairs on June 16, 2021.  Joint statement on 17 November 2021 by the Chair of the Delegation for relations with the South Caucasus, Marina Kaljurand, the European Parliament's Standing Rapporteur on Armenia Andrey Kovatchev and the European Parliament's Standing Rapporteur on Azerbaijan, Željana Zovko called the military operation launched by Azerbaijan on 16 November 2021 the worst violation to-date since ceasefire agreement, condemning any attempts at "borderisation", as observed since the incursion of Azerbaijani troops into Armenian territory on 12 May 2021.

See also
 Armenia–Azerbaijan border
 First Nagorno-Karabakh War
 Second Nagorno-Karabakh War
 2020 Nagorno-Karabakh ceasefire agreement
 September 2022 Armenia–Azerbaijan clashes
 List of conflicts between Armenia and Azerbaijan

References

2021 in Armenia
2022 in Armenia
2023 in Armenia
2021 in Azerbaijan
2022 in Azerbaijan
2023 in Azerbaijan
Conflicts in 2021
Conflicts in 2022
Conflicts in 2023
2021 in international relations
2022 in international relations
2023 in international relations
Armenia–Azerbaijan border
Nagorno-Karabakh conflict
Aftermath of the 2020 Nagorno-Karabakh war
Military conflicts between Armenia and Azerbaijan
Ilham Aliyev
Nikol Pashinyan